At the 2010 Winter Paralympics in Vancouver, British Columbia, Canada Australia sent ever of 11 competitors to compete against 42 other nations with a total of 502 competitors making these Paralympics the largest ever with only 39 countries competing at Torino in 2006. Of these other nations, 2010 was the first winter paralympics for Argentina, Bosnia & Herzegovina, Romania, Russian Federation, and Serbia. The delegation also consisted of 3 sighted guides and 17 support staff. This was the largest delegation Australia had sent to a Winter Paralympics. Australia has participated in every winter Paralympics. In 2010, Dominic Monypenny became the fourth Australian athlete to participate in both the Summer and Winter Paralympic Games, the others being Kyrra Grunnsund, Anthony Bonaccurso, and Michael Milton. In the lead-up to the 2010 winter Games, nine of the 11 Australian athletes had recorded top 10 finishes in Paralympic, world cup or world championship competition in their class.

Disability classification
Every participant at the Paralympics has their disability grouped into one of five disability categories; amputation, the condition may be congenital or sustained through injury or illness; cerebral palsy; wheelchair athletes, there is often overlap between this and other categories; visual impairment, including blindness; and les autres, any physical disability that does not fall strictly under one of the other categories, for example dwarfism or multiple sclerosis. Each Paralympic sport then has its own classifications, dependent upon the specific physical demands of competition. Events are given a code, made of numbers and letters, describing the type of event and classification of the athletes competing. Events with "B" in the code are for athletes with visual impairment, codes LW1 to LW9 are for athletes who stand to compete and LW10 to LW12 are for athletes who compete sitting down. For the 2010 Paralympics alpine skiing events grouped athletes into sitting, standing and visually impaired categories. The same three classifications are also used to group competitors in cross-country skiing.

Athlete classifications
Of the 11 competitors that competed at the 2010 Paralympics, classifications varied:

Administration
Team officials were:
 Chef de Mission – Michael Hartung
 Assistant Chef de Mission – Nick Dean
 Coaches – Steve Graham (Head Coach), Matthew Lyons (Senior Coach), Michael Gould (Assistant * Coach), Daniel Weiland (Nordic Coach)
 Medical – Geoff Thompson (Team Doctor), Brett Robinson (Soft Tissue Therapist), Jason Patchell (Psychologist)
 Media – Tim Mannion (Manager), Margie McDonald (Media Liaison Officer)
 Support Staff – Caroline Walker (Games Coordinator) Alan Dean (Equipment Support), Michael Googan (Attache), Curtis Christian (Ski Technician)

Sponsorship, fundraising and media
The sponsorship and fundraising program originally enabled the Australian Paralympic Committee to extend its ability to fund the Australian team. Estimated costs were believed to amount to approximately 1.25 million in 2010, $9 million in 2012 and $1.6 million in 2014) allowing for support and funding of sports programs and administration costs. The games were broadcast to the Australian public through the ABC broadcast network through daily highlight coverage through the ABC1 channel across the ten days of competition.

Medals and Medalists
While Australia did not achieve medal tallies as extensive as those achieved by strong winter sport countries, the small team achieved one silver (Marty Mayberry) and three bronze (Cameron Rahles-Rahbula x2, Jessica Gallagher) medals, doubling their medal tally from Torino in 2006. Of these medalists Jessica Gallagher was the first Australian woman to win a Paralympic Winter medal. Unlike previous games, the medals did not resemble the traditional rounded shape but rather that of a square with rounded edges with a wave-like design running through the medals. No two medals were designed the same making every individual medal unique to each athlete. The design of each medal was inspired by First Nations imagery featuring the emblem of the Games along wt the IPC's logo. Written on each medal was 'Vancouver 2010 Paralympic Winter Games in French and English as well as 'Vancouver 2010' in Braille.

Mascot 

When presented with their medals, each Australian medalist received a small version of the games mascot Sumi meaning guardian spirit. An animal spirit who was believed to live in the mountains of British Columbia. Sumi is the shape of a bear wearing the hat of the orca whale, flies with the wings of the thunderbird and runs on the furry legs of the black bear.

The Australian team carried their own mascot throughout the games (boxing kangaroo). This mascot has a long history in Australian teams both able and disabled bodies. First used by the successful America's Cup winners, the mascot represents the "Australian fighting spirit" provides self-confidence to many of the competing athletes. Nicknamed "BK", the boxing kangaroo represents and individual is "not lout, nor is he aggressive or arrogant. He is however, assertive when it comes to defending his country's glory". This beloved mascot was commonly used by spectators to show their support for the Australian athletes at events in which Australian's competed. Flags of the mascot are also commonly hung by athletes out of their accommodation windows and over railings to demonstrate national and team pride. Use of the boxing kangaroo mascot at the 2010 winter Paralympics was shrouded in controversy due to earlier disagreement between the Australian Winter Olympic able bodied team and the International Olympic Committee when a two story high flag of the beloved mascot draped over a balcony in the athlete's village was declared to be "too commercial" by the IOC. After, widespread criticism against the IOC in regards to their decision in requesting the flag be removed, after a meeting between the IOC and Australian Olympic Committee resulted in the decision that the flag could stay.

Logo 
The logo of the 2010 Winter Paralympics was described as "representing the spirit of the host region, the athletes journey and the harmony that exists between the athlete, their sport and environment". The emblem of the Paralympic logo aimed to reflect "the athlete's mountainous inner strength and personal transformation as they pushed themselves to new heights in the pursuit of excellence". Through the depicted aspects of the "valley, mountain and sun of the west coast' a human form is created. The overall design is therefore aimed at being homage to the 'harmonious relationship by suggesting that the athlete and mountains are one".

Events
Of the already offered events of Alpine, Ice Sledge Hockey, Biathlon, Cross Country and Wheelchair Curling, the Alpine Skiing Super Combined event was added to the Paralympic Programme. Of the events offered Australia only competed in two: Alpine skiing and Cross-country.

Alpine skiing

Women

Men

Cross-country skiing

See also
Australia at the 2010 Winter Olympics
Australia at the Winter Paralympics
2010 Winter Paralympics

References

External links
Vancouver 2010 Paralympic Games official website
International Paralympic Committee official website
Australian Paralympic Committee Media Guide Vancouver 12–21 March 2010

Nations at the 2010 Winter Paralympics
2010
Paralympics